Deh-e Mardeh may refer to:
 Deh-e Mardeh, Jahanabad
 Deh-e Mardeh, Margan
 Deh-e Mardeh, Qorqori